Michael Hamill (19 January 1889 – 23 July 1943) was an Irish association football wing half who played professionally in Ireland, Scotland, England and the United States.

A native of West Belfast, he learned to play Gaelic football before turning to association football. His first clubs were St Paul's Swifts and Belfast Rangers. After signing for Belfast Celtic, he made his debut against Shelbourne in 1909, but only became a first-team regular at inside-right from 1910 onwards. A skilful performance in a friendly against Celtic led to Manchester United signing him for a new record fee of £175 on New Year's Eve 1910.

His career at Manchester United was blighted by irregular appearances in the first team. A disagreement over a benefit match led to Hamill returning to Belfast Celtic on a free transfer. The fact that Manchester United received no indemnity for the loss of Hamill's services led to an agreement being established between the Football League and the Irish League regarding the transfer of players between the two leagues.

In 1914, Hamill led Ireland to their first Home Championship win. This included a victory over England at Ayresome Park, Middlesbrough, which was considered by many to be Hamill's greatest-ever game. However, he would be capped by Ireland on just seven occasions; he later refused to play for Ireland until alleged discrimination against Catholic players by the Irish Football Association ceased.

Hamill won his first Irish Cup medal with Belfast Celtic in 1918, playing through a knee injury to lead his team to victory over Linfield.

During World War I, Hamill had played in Scotland for a season with Celtic, winning a League and Charity Cup medal. In 1920, after Belfast Celtic temporarily withdrew from competitive football, he returned to Manchester, this time to play for Manchester City.

Hamill later returned to Belfast Celtic but left again in 1925, just after having married. His destination was Fall River, Massachusetts, where he would play for the Fall River Marksmen. He played only two 1924–1925 pre-season exhibition games with the Marksmen. In the first, he performed masterfully in 3–2 victory over the Boston Soccer Club. His second trial game was a fiasco and the team released him after the match. He then immediately signed with Wonder Workers. He spent two seasons in Boston before moving to the New York Giants at the start of the 1926–1927 season. He played only one game before returning to Ireland.

When Hamill returned to Ireland, he signed yet again for Belfast Celtic where he ended his playing career after the 1929–1930 season. He would later manage Belfast club Distillery and run the 'Centre-Half Bar' on Belfast's Falls Road.

His drowned body was recovered from the River Lagan at Lisburn on 23 July 1943.

References

External links
The Magic of Mickey

1889 births
1943 deaths
American Soccer League (1921–1933) players
Association football wing halves
Belfast Celtic F.C. players
Boston Soccer Club players
Celtic F.C. players
Fall River Marksmen players
Irish association footballers (before 1923)
Expatriate footballers in England
NIFL Premiership players
Manchester City F.C. players
Manchester United F.C. players
New York Giants (soccer) players
Association footballers from Northern Ireland
Expatriate sportspeople from Northern Ireland in the United States
Football managers from Northern Ireland
Association footballers from Belfast
Pre-1950 IFA international footballers
English Football League players
Deaths by drowning in the United Kingdom
Accidental deaths in Northern Ireland
Ireland (IFA) wartime international footballers